Acirsa subcarinata is a species of minute deep water sea snail or micromollusk. It is a wentletrap in the family Epitoniidae, a marine gastropod mollusk.

This species is distributed along New Zealand.

References
 Powell A W B, New Zealand Mollusca, William Collins Publishers Ltd, Auckland, New Zealand 1979 

Epitoniidae
Gastropods of New Zealand
Gastropods described in 1906